Watton Priory was a priory of  the Gilbertine Order at Watton in the East Riding of Yorkshire, England.  The double monastery was founded in 1150 by Eustace fitz John.

The present building dates mainly from the fourteenth and fifteenth centuries. A house was added in the nineteenth century. It is a Grade I listed building. King Edward I of England imprisoned young Scottish Princess Marjorie Bruce there after her capture until eight years later, when he himself died.

The priory was dissolved in 1539 by Henry VIII. The last prior Robert Holgate (1481/1482 – 1555) was Bishop of Llandaff from 1537 and then Archbishop of York (from 1545 to 1554).

The Nun of Watton was the protagonist of events, recorded by St Ailred of Rievaulx in De Sanctimoniali de Wattun.  The nun had been admitted to the holy life as a toddler but the young woman was unsuited to the enforced celibacy of the life of a nun and became pregnant by a lay brother in the attached male community.

Burials
William de Vesci (d.1253)

References

Monasteries in the East Riding of Yorkshire
Gilbertine nunneries
Grade I listed churches in the East Riding of Yorkshire
Grade I listed monasteries